Sympistis parvanigra is a species of moth in the family Noctuidae (the owlet moths).

The MONA or Hodges number for Sympistis parvanigra is 10081.

References

Further reading

 
 
 

parvanigra
Articles created by Qbugbot
Moths described in 1923